Mattia Quintarelli (born 2 March 1997) is an Italian male canoeist who won four medals at senior level at the Wildwater Canoeing World Championships.

Medals at the World Championships
Senior

References

External links
 

1997 births
Living people
Italian male canoeists
21st-century Italian people